Kuruvamoozhy is a village located on the village of Koovapally, at Kottayam district of the Indian state of Kerala. In Kuruvamoozhy there is the Catholic Church of Saint Joseph and its parochial school. There is a post office which is under the Erumely post office as well as local groceries, barber shop, bakeries and a petrol pump.

Nearby places
 Changanassery
 Chenappady
 Erumely
 Kanjirappally
 Kottayam
 Mukkoottuthara
 Mundakayam
 Pathanamthitta
 Ranni
Vizhikkithodu

References

Villages in Kottayam district